Nelson Oyarzún Arenas (21 March 1943 – 10 September 1978), known as Consomé (Consomme), was a Chilean football manager.

Club career
Oyarzún was born in Valparaíso in 1942, moving years later to the capital Santiago. He attended Liceo José Victorino Lastarria when he was teenager.

In the early 1970s, he went to Germany to study a football manager grade, finishing it in 1972 at Hamburg. Three years later, Oyarzún joined Lota Schwager, leaving the team amid the tournament. Two seasons later he moved to Deportes Concepción, where despite his short spell was remembered for the incredible performance that the club reached under him as coach alongside the German players Hans Schellberg, Hans Lamour and Ralf Berger. These facts, added his strategy acquired during his years of study at Europe, revolutionized Chilean football.

In 1978, Oyarzún was hired by Chilean giants Universidad de Chile where he re-united with Schellberg, but following bad results he was fired. Months later he joined Ñublense, a first-tier team from Chillán.

Death

Once in Chillán, aged 35 during 1978 as manager of Ñublense, he progressively saw their cancer worsen and died on 10 September.

Hours prior his death at the Herminda Martin Hospital alongside his spouse, his sons and his brother Gastón, he asked the latter to leave him his message to the captain of Carabineros, Fernando Chesta, that he would communicate the team players at the city's Isabel Riquelme Hotel the following:

The message could not be completely transmitted due to the excitement of the players and the same captain of Carabineros. In the afternoon of that same day, Ñublense played against Colo-Colo and won 2–1 in a memorable match. Once finished the game the players knew that Oyarzún had died; his remains rest in the Municipal Cemetery of Chillán.

Personal life
He is the father of Marcelo Oyarzún, a Fitness Coach who was a member of the technical staff of Colo-Colo at the 1991 Copa Libertadores, among others football teams, and grandfather of Diego Oyarzún, a professional football player.

Curiosities
He was commonly known as Consomé (Consomme) due to he used to serve a portion of broth to his players.

References

External links
 Chillán en fotos

1943 births
1978 deaths
Chilean people of Basque descent
People from Valparaíso
Chilean football managers
Lota Schwager managers
Deportes Concepción (Chile) managers
Universidad de Chile managers
Ñublense managers
Chilean Primera División managers
Primera B de Chile managers
Deaths from cancer in Chile